is a railway station located in the city of Kitaakita, Akita Prefecture, Japan, operated by the third sector railway operator Akita Nairiku Jūkan Railway.

Lines
Aniai Station is served by the Nariku Line, and is located 33.0 km from the terminus of the line at Takanosu Station.

Station layout
The station consists of a single island platform serving two tracks, connected to the station building by a level crossing. The station is staffed, and the second story of the station building contains the offices of the Akita Nairiku Jūkan Railway.

Adjacent stations

History
Aniai Station opened on September 25, 1936, as a station on the Japanese Government Railways (JGR) Aniai Line, serving the town of Ani, Akita. The JGR became the Japan National Railways (JNR) after World War II, and the line was extended to Hitachinai Station by October 15, 1963. The line was privatized on November 1, 1986, becoming the Akita Nairiku Jūkan Railway.

Surrounding area
 
Aniai River

External links

 Nairiku Railway Station information 

Railway stations in Japan opened in 1936
Railway stations in Akita Prefecture
Kitaakita